Maurin Bouvet (born May 28, 1995) is a French ice hockey player for Rapaces de Gap and the French national team.

He participated at the 2017 IIHF World Championship.

References

External links

1995 births
Living people
French ice hockey forwards
Sportspeople from Amiens
Rapaces de Gap players
Gothiques d'Amiens players